Nayef al-Bakri (born 29 May 1975) is a Yemeni politician who serves as minister of youth and sports in the cabinet of Prime Minister Khaled Bahah. He was appointed in mid-September 2015, succeeding Rafat Al Akhali.

Bakri served briefly as Governor of Aden in 2015. He previously acted as deputy to Governor Abdel-Aziz bin Habtour. After bin Habtour fled Aden amid intense fighting between pro-Houthi fighters and government loyalists, Bakri became the head of the local Resistance Council. He was appointed governor in July. During his brief tenure as governor, Bakri was considered controversial, but he was very popular with anti-Houthi fighters who defended the city during its months-long assault. After he was tapped to join the Bahah cabinet, members of the Southern Movement protested in Aden, calling for his return.

Bakri's eventual replacement as governor, Major General Jaafar Mohammed Saad, was assassinated in December 2015.

He was a former member of Al-Islah, until he resigned in April 2015.

References

Governors of Aden
1975 births
Living people
Youth and Sports ministers of Yemen
People from Lahj Governorate
Bin Dagher Cabinet
Bahah Cabinet
First Maeen Cabinet
Second Maeen Cabinet